is a Japanese tokusatsu drama produced by Tsuburaya Productions and the 29th entry to the Ultra Series. It aired on TV Tokyo from July 8, 2017 to December 23, 2017. The series is simulcast outside Japan by Crunchyroll.

Synopsis

In the past, a terrifying war raged across the universe, devastating countless planets, instigated by Ultraman Belial and his army. At the climax of the war, hereafter referred to as the Omega Armageddon, Belial defeated the Ultras in battle, then activated a bomb which blew apart the Earth and initiated the Crisis Impact, an apocalyptic event. The Ultras could only watch as the Crisis Impact threatened the universe with destruction, before Ultraman King sacrificed his corporeal form to save everything, essentially becoming the universe’s host.

In the present day, Kei Fukuide, an alien from the ruined Planet Sturm and one of Belial's allies, infiltrates the Land of Light and steals the Ultra Capsules - an invention developed by Ultraman Hikari that serve to contain a fraction of a specific Ultra's powers - then reverse engineers them into Kaiju Capsules. Meanwhile on Earth, Riku Asakura is a teenager with no knowledge of his past, save for being found near an astronomical observatory as a baby following the Crisis Impact. When a giant monster destroys his home, Riku and his alien roommate Pega stumble upon a secret base 500 meters below the ground. Riku learns he is an Ultraman in human form and is given the ability to use the Geed Riser transformation device and Ultra Capsules by the base's operating system RE.M. to become Ultraman Geed to save everyone.

Deciding to fight against fate, he is joined by monster hunter Laiha Toba, AIB agent Moa Aizaki, and office worker Leito Igaguri, who becomes the host of Belial's nemesis Ultraman Zero. Riku soon learns that the monsters he faces are Fusion Rise forms of Kei Fukuide, who seeks those who are hosts to unformed Ultra Capsules called Little Stars. In the middle of the series, Riku discovered that he was a clone of Belial manufactured by Kei to gather the Ultra Capsules in order to revive the dark Ultra. At some point of time, Belial returned to Earth and kidnapped his son in an attempt to sway the latter to his side but failed due to Ultraman King and Laiha's intervention. With the power bestowed by Ultraman King, Geed received a new form known as Royal Mega-Master and defeated his father.

With Belial seemingly dead, an amnesic Kei attempts to continue his master's legacy, and is taken in by Arie Ishikari, a nonfiction author who is secretly Belial's host, having been selected after his initial defeat. Eventually, Belial launches his final attack, stealing Kei's Sturm Organ, using its Carellen Element to absorb vast quantities of King's essence, the Childhood Radiation. Having taken on a new form dubbed Belial Atrocious, Belial intends to destroy Earth, then the Land of Light. Zero succeeded in separating Ultraman King from Belial while Father of Ultra came to Earth and sealed him within a barrier. The next day, Riku took matters on his own as he fights his father in one-on-one combat with his will allowing Ultraman King to summon copies of his Fusion Rise forms into his aid. In the midst of the final battle, a delirious Kei, near death due to the loss of his Sturm Organ, attempts to menace Leito's family, only to be confronted by Laiha, who defeats him in a swordfight. Mortally wounded, Kei asks if he was really just another pawn to Belial, before dissolving into green particles and dying. At the climax of his battle with Belial, Riku tried to understand his father's pain and suffering from his banishment, but was forced to kill him when Belial continued his attack. With the fight over, a fully healed Zero joined Father of Ultra and Ultraman King as they left Earth and Riku resumed his normal life.

Episodes

Ultraman Geed the Movie
 was  released on March 10, 2018.

Other appearances

Film and team-up
Ultraman Geed made his debut in the final scene of Ultra Fight Orb, where he was shown killing Reibatos when other Ultras assumed him to have died after being defeated by Ultraman Orb, though this appearance was later proven false, as shown in the series finale in which Belial was the one who killed Reibatos.
Ultraman R/B the Movie (2018): See here
Ultra Galaxy Fight: New Generation Heroes/Ultraman Taiga (2019)/Ultraman Taiga The Movie (2020): See here
Ultraman Z (2020): See here

Production

The Ultraman Geed trademark was filed by Tsuburaya Productions on March 6, 2017. The series was announced on April 27, 2017 by the official website of Tsuburaya Productions and Sports Hochi. The main actor Tatsuomi Hamada mentioned that becoming an Ultraman is a childhood dream since his kindergarten. As he had once played Nao, one of the protagonists in the 2010 Ultra Series movie Ultraman Zero: The Revenge of Belial, he is also excited to view Belial as a father instead of an antagonist of the previous movie while his character grew up and faced his destiny.

According to Koichi Sakamoto, he views Riku as a man who fights as Belial's son while facing challenges without getting bound by the "common senses of an Ultraman series". As the show revolves around a protagonist fighting with the blood of a villain, he related the plot towards that of Devilman. Writer Otsuichi mentioned that he used to watch Ultraman X and Ultraman Orb with his son back home and was advised to use Arthur C. Clarke's novel Childhood's End as a reference material for the first stage of the project. Said author's name becomes the foundation of the main character's name, Riku Asakura. The theme of Riku being Belial's son was an idea he thought of but never expected it to be conceptualized by Tsuburaya themselves. He stresses the difficulty of writing the script of the first episode, with the Ultra and the transformation item that were yet to be named. He is also well-aware that this is not the first tokusatsu series to be written by a novelist, as this was preceded by Gen Urobuchi in Kamen Rider Gaim.

Cast
/: 
: 
: 
: 
: 
: 
: 
: 
: 
Newscaster: 
: 
: 
: 
: 
Alien Shadow "Zena" (Voice): 
: 
: 
Riser Voice (Ultra Capsule scan), : 
Riser Voice (Monster Capsule scan), Narration (0), :

Guest cast

: 
: 
: 
:

Songs
Opening theme

Lyrics: 
Composition & Arrangement: 
Artists: Riku Asakura (Tatsuomi Hamada) with 
Episodes: 1-17 (Verse 1), 18-24 (Verse 2)

Ending theme

Lyrics: TAKERU, 
Composition & Arrangement: 
Artists: Voyager
Episodes: 1-17 (Verse 1), 18-24 (Verse 2), Finale

International broadcast
In Hong Kong, this series aired on ViuTV on July 21, 2018. In Indonesia, this series aried on RTV (Indonesian TV channel) on October 9, 2018. In the Philippines, this series will set to air on TV5 soon.

See also
Ultra Series - Complete list of official Ultraman-related shows.

References

External links
Ultraman Geed at Tsuburaya Productions (in English)
Ultraman Geed at Tsuburaya Productions 
Ultraman Geed at TV Tokyo 

2017 Japanese television series debuts
Ultra television series
TV Tokyo original programming
2017 Japanese television series endings